The following lists events in the year 1990 in China.

Incumbents
General Secretary of the Communist Party: Jiang Zemin
President: Yang Shangkun
Premier: Li Peng
Vice President: Wang Zhen
Vice Premier: Yao Yilin

Governors  
 Governor of Anhui Province – Fu Xishou 
 Governor of Fujian Province – Wang Zhaoguo then Jia Qinglin 
 Governor of Gansu Province – Jia Zhijie
 Governor of Guangdong Province – Ye Xuanping 
 Governor of Guizhou Province – Wang Zhaowen
 Governor of Hainan Province – Liu Jianfeng
 Governor of Hebei Province – Yue Qifeng then Cheng Weigao
 Governor of Heilongjiang Province – Shao Qihui 
 Governor of Henan Province – Cheng Weigao then Li Changchun 
 Governor of Hubei Province – Guo Zhenqian then Guo Shuyan 
 Governor of Hunan Province – Chen Bangzhu
 Governor of Jiangsu Province – Chen Huanyou  
 Governor of Jiangxi Province – Wu Guanzheng  
 Governor of Jilin Province – Wang Zhongyu
 Governor of Liaoning Province – Li Changchun (until July), Yue Qifeng (starting July)
 Governor of Qinghai Province – Jin Jipeng
 Governor of Shaanxi Province – Hou Zongbin (until March), Bai Qingcai (starting March)
 Governor of Shandong Province – Zhao Zhihao 
 Governor of Shanxi Province – Wang Senhao 
 Governor of Sichuan Province – Zhang Haoruo  
 Governor of Yunnan Province – Li Jiating 
 Governor of Zhejiang Province – Shen Zulun (until November), Ge Hongsheng (starting November)

Events
September 22 – October 7: 1990 Asian Games in Beijing.
October 2: 1990 Guangzhou Baiyun airport collisions, two commercial planes crashed, a total of 128 lives were lost, 53 persons were hurt, 97 persons survived in Guangdong, according to the China Civil Aviation official confirmed report.
Unknown date: Li-Ning sports goods company was founded.

Births
March 2 – Adderly Fong, Hong Kong Chinese racing driver

Deaths
February 4 – Gao Yinxian, Linguist and writer (born c. 1902)

See also
 1990 in Chinese film

References

 
China
Years of the 20th century in China
1990s in China
China